This article lists those who were potential candidates for the Democratic nomination for Vice President of the United States in the 2000 election. Incumbent Vice President Al Gore won the 2000 Democratic nomination for President of the United States, and chose Connecticut Senator Joseph Lieberman as his running mate on August 7, 2000. Lieberman, a centrist two-term Democratic senator, was chosen for being "tough on defense" and foreign policy issues. Lieberman was the first Jew chosen for a national ticket. The choice of Lieberman was announced shortly before the 2000 Democratic National Convention. Former Secretary of State Warren Christopher led the vetting process. The Gore–Lieberman ticket ultimately lost to the Bush–Cheney ticket. Coincidental to the presidential election, Lieberman was re-elected to a third term as senator from Connecticut.

Selection

Shortlist

Announcement 
In August 2000, Gore announced that he had selected Senator Joe Lieberman of Connecticut as his vice presidential running mate. Lieberman became the first person of the Jewish faith to appear on a major party's presidential ticket (Barry Goldwater, the Republican presidential nominee in 1964, was of Jewish descent but identified as an Episcopalian). Lieberman, who was a more conservative Democrat than Gore, had publicly blasted President Clinton for the Monica Lewinsky affair. Many pundits saw Gore's choice of Lieberman as another way of trying to distance himself from the scandals of the Clinton White House.

Media speculation on possible vice presidential candidates

Members of Congress

Governors

Federal executive branch officials

See also
Al Gore 2000 presidential campaign
2000 Democratic Party presidential primaries
2000 Democratic National Convention
2000 United States presidential election
List of United States major party presidential tickets

References

Al Gore 2000 presidential campaign
Al Gore
Vice presidency of the United States
Joe Lieberman
John Kerry
John Edwards
Evan Bayh